Point Lookout is an 8,427-foot (2,569 meter) elevation sandstone summit located in Mesa Verde National Park, in Montezuma County of southwest Colorado. Soldiers from Fort Lewis army post used its lofty position to send heliographic signals to troops campaigning in the west. A trail climbs 2.2 miles (3.5 km) round-trip to the top and offers views of Montezuma and Mancos valleys, as well as the La Plata Mountains. This geographical feature's name was officially adopted in 1934 by the U.S. Board on Geographic Names.

Geology
The main entrance road to Mesa Verde National Park traverses the east flank of Point Lookout as it climbs the escarpment of the East Rim of Mesa Verde. Point Lookout is located on the Colorado Plateau, and is composed of 400-foot thick Cretaceous Point Lookout Sandstone, which is the oldest of the three formations that make up the Mesaverde Group which is common to the Mesa Verde region. The cliff-forming Point Lookout Sandstone overlays softer, slope-forming Mancos Shale, which is 2,000 feet thick and extends to the valley floor. Precipitation runoff from this feature drains into the San Juan River watershed.

Gallery

Climate

According to the Köppen climate classification system, Point Lookout is located in a Humid continental climate zone. April through October are the most favorable months to visit.
<div style="width:100%;">

See also
 List of rock formations in the United States

References

External links
 Weather forecast: National Weather Service

Colorado Plateau
Landforms of Montezuma County, Colorado
Mesa Verde National Park
Buttes of Colorado
North American 2000 m summits
Sandstone formations of the United States